George Sher is a moral philosopher and political philosopher who has taught at Rice University since 1991.

Education and career

Sher earned his bachelor's degree at Brandeis University and his Ph.D. in Philosophy from Columbia University in 1972. He taught at the University of Vermont before moving to Rice

Philosophical work

His work has largely focused on liberalism, perfectionism, and issues in moral psychology. He is married to essayist and novelist Emily Fox Gordon.

Bibliography
 Desert, Princeton University Press, 1987; paperback, 1989.
 Beyond Neutrality: Perfectionism and Politics, Cambridge University Press, 1997.  Chinese edition (Hebei People's Publishing House) forthcoming.
 Approximate Justice: Studies in Non-Ideal Theory, Rowman and Littlefield, 1997.
 In Praise of Blame, Oxford University Press, 2006.
 Who Knew? Responsibility Without Awareness, Oxford University Press, 2009.
 Equality for Inegalitarians, Cambridge University Press, 2014.
 Me, You, Us, Oxford University Press, 2017.

See also
 American philosophy
 List of American philosophers

References

External links
 George Sher - Rice University Philosophy

Living people
Rice University faculty
Brandeis University alumni
Columbia University alumni
Moral psychologists
20th-century American philosophers
21st-century American philosophers
Year of birth missing (living people)